A by-election was held for the Australian House of Representatives seat of Lang on 29 August 1953. This was triggered by the death of Labor MP Dan Mulcahy. A by-election for the seat of Corangamite was held on the same day.

The by-election was won by Labor candidate Frank Stewart.

Results

References

1953 elections in Australia
New South Wales federal by-elections